Sergeal Phillipe Petersen (born 1 August 1994) is a South African rugby union player for the  in Super Rugby and  in the Currie Cup. His regular position is winger.

Rugby

Youth Rugby

His performances in the latter tournament earned him inclusion in the South African Schools team that played against France, Wales and England in August 2012. Petersen scored a try in each of those matches to ensure that the South African remained unbeaten in the series.

Petersen was included in the squad for the 2013 IRB Junior World Championship, but failed to recover from a hamstring injury in time and was replaced by Jesse Kriel. He got a second opportunity the following year when he was included in the South Africa Under-20 side for the 2014 IRB Junior World Championship held in New Zealand. He opened his scoring in that competition just half an hour into the opening match against Scotland, helping his side to a 61–5 victory. He started their second match of the competition, where South Africa beat the hosts and four-time winners New Zealand 33–24, and scored a try in the final minute of their last match of the pool stages to secure a 21–8 victory over Samoa. Petersen contributed largely to South Africa once again beating New Zealand in the semi-final of the competition, this time winning 32–25 and he started his fifth consecutive match of the competition in the final against England; however, this time he finished on the losing side, with England winning the match 21–20 to be crowned champions for the second consecutive year.

Eastern Province Kings / Southern Kings

After finishing school at the end of 2012, Petersen signed a three-year contract with the Kings despite interest from several other teams. A few months later – and without any first class matches under his belt – he was named in the  squad for the 2013 Super Rugby season. He also scored the Kings' first ever try in Super Rugby...as well as their second during the second half, earning him a Man of the Match award.

A further two appearances followed that season, as well as one for the  side during the 2013 Under-21 Provincial Championship. He also helped out the  side during their title run-in in the 2013 Under-19 Provincial Championship series.

Upon his return from international duty at the 2014 IRB Junior World Championship, he was included in their squad for the 2014 Currie Cup Premier Division season. He was not involved in any matches for the first team at all, instead representing the  side in the 2014 Under-21 Provincial Championship. He scored seven tries in seven appearances as the side won the Under-21 competition for the third consecutive season and also scored two tries in their promotion play-off match against  to help them secure promotion to Group A for 2015.

Cheetahs

In July 2014, it was widely reported that Petersen signed a contract to play for the  during the 2015 Super Rugby season, while still being available for the  during the 2015 Currie Cup Premier Division. However, Kings CEO Charl Crous said that, while they would assist their players in gaining Super Rugby experience, no deal was in place with the Cheetahs for a Petersen loan for 2015.

Sevens

In October 2013, Petersen was called into a South Africa Sevens training squad prior to the 2013 Dubai Sevens.

South Africa 'A'

In 2016, Petersen was included in a South Africa 'A' squad that played a two-match series against a touring England Saxons team. He didn't play in their first match in Bloemfontein, but started the second match of the series, scoring two tries in a 26–29 defeat in George.

Athletics

Petersen also excelled in athletics, representing South Africa at the 2011 World Youth Championships in Athletics in the 100m and long jump events and at the 2011 Commonwealth Youth Games in 100m and 100m relay.

References

External links
 

South African rugby union players
Eastern Province Elephants players
Southern Kings players
People from Humansdorp
Living people
1994 births
South Africa Under-20 international rugby union players
Cheetahs (rugby union) players
Free State Cheetahs players
Western Province (rugby union) players
Stormers players
Rugby union wings
Rugby union players from the Eastern Cape
Shimizu Koto Blue Sharks players